The United States Chess Federation (also known as US Chess or USCF) is the governing body for chess competition in the United States and represents the U.S. in FIDE, the World Chess Federation. US Chess administers the official national rating system, awards national titles, sanctions over twenty national championships annually, and publishes two magazines: Chess Life and Chess Life for Kids. The USCF was founded and incorporated in Illinois in 1939, from the merger of two older chess organizations.  It is a 501(c)(3) non-profit organization headquartered in St. Louis, Missouri. Its membership  as COVID hit was 97,000; as of July 2022 it is 85,000.

History
In 1939, the United States of America Chess Federation was created in Illinois through the merger of the American Chess Federation and National Chess Federation.  The American Chess Federation, formerly the Western Chess Association, had held an annual open championship since 1900; that tournament, after the merger, became the U.S. Open.  The National Chess Federation, founded in 1927 to organize U.S. participation in the Olympiads, had held the prestigious invitational U.S. Championship since 1936.

The combined membership at the time was around 1,000. Membership experienced consistent, modest growth until 1958, when Bobby Fischer won the U.S. Championship at the age of 14.  This began the "Fischer era", during which USCF membership grew thirty-fold, to approximately 60,000 in 1974, after Fischer had won the World Chess Championship.

The Fischer era did not last long, but the USCF has grown substantially since then, largely because of the explosive growth of scholastic chess.  Annual national championship tournaments are now held at different grade and age levels; none of these tournaments, which now attract thousands of players, even existed prior to 1969.

At its founding, the USCF had no employees and no headquarters, but in 1952, it hired a Business Manager (the position eventually became Executive Director), headquartered in New York.  In 1967, headquarters moved to Newburgh, New York; in 1976, New Windsor, New York; in 2006, Crossville, Tennessee; and in 2022, St. Louis, Missouri.

Governance
The U.S. Chess Federation has, in effect, two governing bodies.  The Board of Delegates, composed of 125 persons designated by the state affiliates, as well as some other categories, meets annually at the U.S. Open.  The Executive Board, composed of seven persons elected by the membership to staggered three-year terms, meets quarterly.

Ratings

US Chess implements rating systems for chess players.  In each system, a rating is a calculated numerical estimate of a player's strength, based on results in tournament play against other rated players.  Tournament organizers submit results to US Chess, which carries out the calculations and publishes the results.

A player can have up to six ratings:  for correspondence games, for over-the-board games at regular (slow), quick, or blitz time controls, and for online games at quick or blitz time controls.  Ratings are posted online on the US Chess Player Search web page.  Ratings for over-the-board play range from 100 to nearly 3000, with a higher rating indicating a stronger player.  Ratings are often used by tournament organizers to determine eligibility for "class" prizes, and eligibility to enter "class" sections, in tournaments.

USCF first instituted a rating system for over-the-board play in 1950, using a calculation formula devised by Kenneth Harkness.  In 1960, the USCF adopted a more reliable rating system invented by Arpad Elo, a college professor of physics who was a chess master. Elo worked with USCF for many years.  The system he invented, or a variant of it, was later adopted by FIDE, and is utilized in other games and sports, including USA Today's college football and basketball rankings.  USCF has made further adjustments to the rating calculation over the years; the present calculation was influenced by the "Glicko rating system" developed by Prof. Mark Glickman, a significant refinement of Elo's system.

Titles

US Chess awards titles for lifetime achievement. These should not be confused with the titles awarded by FIDE, such as Grandmaster and International Master.

US Chess awards a player who achieves a rating of 2200 or above the title of National Master and sends the player a certificate.  Likewise, a Senior Master certificate is awarded for a rating of 2400 or higher.  Until 2008, the only other title awarded was that of Life Master, awarded to players who played 300 or more rated games while maintaining a rating above 2200.

In 2008, the USCF implemented a system of "norms-based titles", patterned after the titles awarded by FIDE:  if a person has (for example) five tournaments in which they demonstrate strength above 2400, and if in addition their rating at some time eventually reaches 2400, then they earn the Life Senior Master title.  The system is somewhat more complicated than this simple example suggests.  The old Life Master title was renamed Original Life Master to avoid confusion with the new Life Master title; both are recognized and tracked by US Chess.  Titles are posted on the same Player Search web page as ratings.

National championships
US Chess organizes or sanctions various national championships.  Most of these are held annually.

The oldest is the U.S. Open.  It began as the Western Open in 1900, held in Minnesota.  It is the "congress" of US Chess – the annual meeting of the Delegates is held concurrently, as well as many smaller gatherings and events.  Several hundred players participate (the highest number, 836, was at the 1983 event in Pasadena). Five invitational events are held concurrently. Each US Chess state affiliate nominates a representative to each of the five invitationals. The five invitationals are: The National Tournament of Senior State Champions (50+), The GM Arnold Denker National Tournament of High School State Champions (9-12), The Dewain Barber National Tournament of Middle School State Champions (6-8), The John D. Rockefeller National Tournament of Elementary School State Champions (K-5), and The Ruth Haring National Tournament of Girls State Champions (K-12). Players generally qualify for these events by winning a state championship tournament, although each state affiliate is allowed to use any criteria for selecting its representatives. 

The U.S. Championship, an invitational event, has been held since 1936.  (For many years before that, the national championship had been decided by head-to-head match play.)  Noteworthy past winners include Samuel Reshevsky and Bobby Fischer, eight times each; Walter Browne, six times; and Larry Evans and Gata Kamsky, five times each.  The 2019 tournament was won by Hikaru Nakamura.

The U.S. Women's Championship, also invitational, has been held since 1937.  In recent years it has been held concurrently with the U.S. Championship.  The 2019 tournament was won by Jennifer Yu.

The largest national championships are the Elementary (K-6), Junior High (K-9), and High School (K-12) Championships which are held annually in the spring.  Every four years the "Supernationals," an event combining all three in one tournament, is held. The last Supernationals in 2017 drew over 5,500 players to Nashville, Tennessee and was claimed to be the largest rated chess tournament ever.  The oldest of the three, the National High School, was first held in 1969 by the Continental Chess Association.

The Elementary, Junior High, and High School championships should not be confused with the National Grade Level Championships, held in December, in which each grade level from K to 12 has its own championship.

Except for the U.S. Championship, the tournaments listed above are organized by US Chess itself.  But the US Chess calendar of national events also includes quite a few events that are bid out to interested affiliates.  Here is a partial list:

US Chess also organizes national championships of correspondence chess:

Publications
US Chess publishes two magazines, the monthly Chess Life, and bi-monthly Chess Life for Kids, which is geared towards those under 14.  Chess Life, which began in 1946 as a bi-weekly newspaper, is now a glossy full-color magazine of 72 pages per issue.

US Chess also publishes a rulebook. The current 7th edition is self-published by US Chess and produced in paperback and kindle forms. The most relevant chapters for over-the-board play are also available to download for free online from the US Chess website.

See also
 Executive Directors of the United States Chess Federation
 Fédération Internationale des Échecs (FIDE)
 International Correspondence Chess Federation (ICCF)
 Presidents of the United States Chess Federation
 Scholastic chess in the United States

References

External links
 
 United States Chess Federation - Member Services Area from 
 Official data in the USCF Yearbook 2016 PDF

United States
Chess in the United States
Chess
1939 establishments in Illinois
Sports organizations established in 1939
Chess organizations
1939 in chess
501(c)(3) organizations
Cumberland County, Tennessee